Michael Giffin (born January 24, 1984 in Kingston, Ontario) is a retired professional Canadian football running back who most recently played for the Montreal Alouettes of the Canadian Football League. He was signed as a free agent by the Alouettes, originally late in 2008. He played his CIS football for the Queen's Golden Gaels. While at Queen's University, he was chosen a first-team All-Canadian in 2007 and 2008, He was a runner-up for the Hec Crighton Trophy as the top football player in the country. He became the first Queen's player to rush for more than 1,000 yards in a single season in school history. Giffin finished his Queen's career as the school's all-time leading rusher. 

On May 10, 2012, Giffin announced his retirement.

References

1984 births
Living people
Canadian football running backs
Montreal Alouettes players
Players of Canadian football from Ontario
Sportspeople from Kingston, Ontario
Queen's Golden Gaels football players